Lennart Petrell (born 13 April 1984) is a Finnish professional ice hockey player, currently playing for HIFK of the Finnish Liiga.

Playing career
He was originally drafted in the 6th round (190th overall) on the 2004 NHL Entry Draft by the Columbus Blue Jackets. Staying in his native Finland, Petrell played eight seasons with HIFK in the SM-liiga.

On 15 June 2011, he signed a one-year entry level contract with the Edmonton Oilers. During his first North American season in 2011–12 with the Oilers, Petrell scored his first NHL goal on 3 November 2011, against Jonathan Quick of the Los Angeles Kings. On 2 January 2012, Petrell was reassigned to the Oklahoma City Barons of the American Hockey League for a nine-game stint before returning to the Oilers.

After a second season with the Oilers, Petrell was released as a free agent and returned to Europe, signing a one-year deal with Swiss club, Genève-Servette HC of the NLA on 14 August 2013. After one year in Switzerland, he signs a two-year deal with the Swedish club Luleå HF on May 16, 2014.

Following the 2015–16 season in Sweden, Petrell returned to his hometown club, HIFK, on a one-year contract on 12 May 2016.

Career statistics

Regular season and playoffs

International

References

External links

1984 births
Living people
Columbus Blue Jackets draft picks
Edmonton Oilers players
Finnish ice hockey left wingers
Genève-Servette HC players
HIFK (ice hockey) players
Luleå HF players
Oklahoma City Barons players
Ice hockey people from Helsinki